Kirby Howell-Baptiste (born 7 February 1987) is a British actress. She has appeared as a series regular on Downward Dog (2017), Killing Eve (2018), Why Women Kill (2019), and The Sandman (2022). Her television appearances also include recurring roles on Love (2016–2018), Barry (2018–2019), The Good Place (2018–2020), and the fourth season of Veronica Mars (2019), and a starring role in the second and third books of the animated series Infinity Train (2020) as Grace Monroe.

Early life and education
Howell-Baptiste is from London. Her mother owned clothing stalls in Camden. Howell-Baptiste began acting at the Anna Scher Theatre.

Career
Howell-Baptiste's acting career has included many appearances in guest and recurring television series roles, in addition to several short and feature-length films. Her earlier television work includes the IFC sketch comedy series Comedy Bang! Bang! and the Showtime series House of Lies. She was also a series regular in the short-lived ABC series Downward Dog in 2017. Howell-Baptiste followed in 2018 with her role as Elena in the first season of the BBC America series Killing Eve. She currently has a recurring role as actress Sasha Baxter in the HBO comedy-drama series Barry, and has appeared as neuroscientist Simone Garnett on the NBC series The Good Place, beginning in the third season. On streaming television platforms, Howell-Baptiste has had recurring roles on the Netflix series Love and the fourth season of Veronica Mars for Hulu, and appeared in the main cast of the CBS All Access series Why Women Kill for its first season. She booked the role of Anita Darling in Disney's Cruella in 2021.

Filmography

Film

Television

References

External links
 
 

1987 births
Living people
Alumni of the Anna Scher Theatre School
Actresses from London
Black British actresses
English film actresses
English people of Jamaican descent
English television actresses
English voice actresses
English web series actresses
People from the London Borough of Camden
21st-century English actresses